Spastique is the fourth major release and third full-length album by Magic Lunchbox. 
The title is supposedly a reference to an infamous nightclub in west Paris.

The closing track "Fashanu" is possibly the only known song dedicated to English Premier League footballer John Fashanu, and the match-fixing scandal involving him, Bruce Grobbelaar and Hans Segers.

Track listing
All songs written by Magic Lunchbox.
"Dreaming is Over" 
"New Shoes" 
"Taking a Chance"
"Doin' Alright"
"Gay Tennis Coach"
"Fix My Mo'"
"Song For Greg"
"I Can See"
"Fashanu"

Personnel
 Ernie Luney - vocals, guitar, keyboard
 Danny Nighttime - guitar, backing vocals
 Rob Child - bass, guitar
 Damian Kukulj - drums, V-Drums
 Lauren Freedom - vocals

References

External links
 FasterLouder.com review

2005 albums
Magic Lunchbox albums